Jan Erik Hansen (September 24, 1940 – January 28, 2018) was a Norwegian ice hockey player. He played for the Norwegian national ice hockey team, and  participated in the Winter Olympics in 1964, where he placed tenth with the Norwegian team.

References

1940 births
2018 deaths
Ice hockey people from Oslo
Norwegian ice hockey players
Olympic ice hockey players of Norway
Ice hockey players at the 1964 Winter Olympics
Frisk Asker Ishockey players